Jorge José Ruiz Aguilar (13 May 1928 – October 2013) was a Mexican footballer. He competed in the men's tournament at the 1948 Summer Olympics.

References

External links
 

1928 births
2013 deaths
Mexican footballers
Mexico international footballers
Olympic footballers of Mexico
Footballers at the 1948 Summer Olympics
Place of birth missing
Association football forwards